The following is a list of astronomers, astrophysicists and other notable people who have made contributions to the field of astronomy. They may have won major prizes or awards, developed or invented widely used techniques or technologies within astronomy, or are directors of major observatories or heads of space-based telescope projects.

Notable astronomers



In alphabetical order:

A

Aryabhata (India, 476–550)
Marc Aaronson (USA, 1950–1987)
George Ogden Abell (USA, 1927–1983)
Hiroshi Abe (Japan, 1958–)
Antonio Abetti (Italy, 1846–1928)
Giorgio Abetti (Italy, 1882–1982)
Charles Greeley Abbot (USA, 1872–1973)
Charles Hitchcock Adams (USA, 1868–1951)
John Couch Adams (UK, 1819–1892)
Walter Sydney Adams (USA, 1876–1956)
Saul Adelman (USA, 1944–)
Petrus Alphonsi (Spain, 1062–1110)
Agrippa (Greece, fl. ca. 92)
Paul Oswald Ahnert (Germany, 1897–1989)
Eva Ahnert-Rohlfs (Germany, 1912–1954)
George Biddell Airy (UK, 1801–1892)
Robert Aitken, (USA, 1864–1951)
Makio Akiyama (Japan, 1950–)
Al Battani (Iraq, 850–929)
Albategnius (see Al-Batani)
Vladimir Aleksandrovich Albitzky (Russia, 1891–1952)
Albumasar (Persia 787–886)
George Alcock (UK, 1913–2000)
Harold Alden (USA, 1890–1964)
Hannes Alfvén (Sweden, 1908–1995)
Lawrence H. Aller (USA, 1913–2003)
Abd Al-Rahman Al Sufi (Persia, 903–986)
Viktor Amazaspovich Ambartsumian, (Armenia, 1912–1996)
John August Anderson (USA, 1876–1959)
Wilhelm Anderson (Estonia, 1880–1940)
Marie Henri Andoyer (France, 1862–1929)
Andronicus of Cyrrhus (Greece, fl. 100 BC)
Anders Jonas Ångström (Sweden, 1814–1874)
Eugène Michel Antoniadi (Greece-France, 1870–1944)
Masakatsu Aoki (Japan, 1957–)
Petrus Apianus (Germany, 1495–1557)
François Arago (France, 1786–1853)
Masaru Arai (Japan, 1952–)
Hiroshi Araki (Japan)
Sylvain Arend (Belgium, 1902–1992)
Friedrich Wilhelm Argelander (Germany, 1799–1875)
Aristarchus of Samos (Greece, ca. 310 BC–ca. 230 BC)
Christoph Arnold (Germany, 1650–1695)
Halton Christian Arp (USA, 1927–2013)
Svante Arrhenius (Sweden, 1859–1927)
Arzachel (Spain, 1028–1087)
Asada Goryu (Japan, 1734–1799)
Atsuo Asami (Japan)
Giuseppe Asclepi (Italy, 1706–1776)
Joseph Ashbrook (USA, 1918–1980)
Arthur Auwers (Germany, 1838–1915)
Adrien Auzout (France, 1622–1691)
David Axon (England, 1951–2012)

B
Brahmagupta (India, 598–668 CE)
Bhaskara I (India, 629 CE)
Bhaskara II (India, 1114–1185)
Walter Baade (Germany, 1893–1960)
Harold D. Babcock (USA, 1882–1968)
Horace W. Babcock (USA, 1912–2003)
Oskar Backlund (Sweden, 1846–1916)
John N. Bahcall (USA, 1934–2005)
Yoshiaki Banno (Japan, 1952–1991)
Benjamin Baillaud (France, 1848–1934)
Jules Baillaud (France, 1876–1960)
Jean-Baptiste Baille  (France, 1841–1918)
Jean Sylvain Bailly (France, 1736–1793)
Francis Baily (UK, 1774–1844)
John Bainbridge (UK, 1582–1643)
John E. Baldwin (UK, 1931–2010)
Sallie Baliunas (USA, 1953–)
Zoltán Balog (Hungary/USA, 1972–)
Benjamin Banneker (USA, 1731–1806)
Pietro Baracchi (Italy, Australia, 1851–1926)
Beatriz Barbuy (Brazil, 1950–)
Edward Emerson Barnard (USA, 1857–1923)
Julius Bauschinger (France, 1860–1934)
Johann Bayer (Germany, 1572–1625)
Antonín Bečvář (Slovakia, 1901–1965)
Wilhelm Beer (Germany, 1797–1850)
Sergei Ivanovich Belyavsky (Russia, 1883–1953)
Charles L. Bennett  (USA, 1956–)
Jocelyn Bell Burnell (UK, 1943–)
Friedrich Wilhelm Bessel (Germany, 1784–1846)
Somnath Bharadwaj (India, 1964–)
Wilhelm Freiherr von Biela (Austria, 1782–1856)
Ludwig Biermann (Germany, 1907–1986)
Wolf Bickel (Germany. 1942–)
Guillaume Bigourdan (France, 1851–1932)
James Binney (UK, 1950–)
Biruni (Persia, 973–1048)
Gennady S. Bisnovatyi-Kogan (Russia, 1941–)
Adriaan Blaauw (Netherlands, 1914–2010)
Nathaniel Bliss (UK, 1700–1764)
Johann Elert Bode (Germany, 1747–1826)
Alfred Bohrmann (Germany, 1904–2000)
Bart Bok (Netherlands, 1906–1983)
Charles Thomas Bolton (USA/Canada, 1943–2021)
John Gatenby Bolton (UK/Australia, 1922–1993)
William Cranch Bond (USA, 1789–1859)
Alphonse Borrelly (France, 1842–1926)
Rudjer Boscovich (Dalmatia, 1711–1787)
Lewis Boss (USA, 1846–1912)
Alexis Bouvard (France, 1767–1843)
Rychard Bouwens (USA, 1972–)
Edward L. G. Bowell (USA, 1943–)
Ira Sprague Bowen (USA, 1898–1973)
Louis Boyer (France, 1901–1999)
Brian J. Boyle  (Scotland and Australia, 1960–)
Ronald N. Bracewell (Australia, USA, 1921–2007)
James Bradley (UK, 1693–1762)
William A. Bradfield (New Zealand, Australia, 1927–2014)
Tycho Brahe (Denmark, 1546–1601)
John Alfred Brashear (USA, 1840–1920)
William Robert Brooks (USA, 1844–1922)
Theodor Brorsen (Denmark, 1819–1895)
Dirk Brouwer (Netherlands–USA, 1902–1966)
Ernest William Brown (UK, 1866–1938)
Michael (Mike) E. Brown (USA, 1965–)
Hermann Alexander Brück (Germany, 1905–2000)
Ismael Bullialdus (France, 1605–1694)
Margaret Burbidge (UK–USA, 1919–2020)
Robert Burnham, Jr. (USA, 1931–1993)
Sherburne Wesley Burnham (USA, 1838–1921)
Schelte J. Bus (USA, 1956–)
Bimla Buti (India, 1933–)

C

William Wallace Campbell (USA, 1862–1938)
Annie Jump Cannon (USA, 1863–1941)
Luigi Carnera (Italy, 1875–1962)
Edwin Francis Carpenter (USA, 1898–1963)
James Carpenter (UK, 1840–1899)
Richard Christopher Carrington (UK, 1826–1875)
Sir John Carroll (UK, 1899–1974)
César-François Cassini de Thury (France, 1714–1784)
Dominique, comte de Cassini (France, 1748–1845)
Giovanni Domenico Cassini (France, 1625–1712)
Jacques Cassini (France, 1677–1756)
Bonaventura Cavalieri (Italy, 1598–1647)
Anders Celsius (Sweden, 1701–1744)
Vincenzo Cerulli (Italy, 1859–1927)
Jean Chacornac (France, 1823–1873)
James Challis (UK, 1803–1882)
Radha Gobinda Chandra (Bangladesh, India, 1878–1975)
Subrahmanyan Chandrasekhar (India, USA, 1910–1995)
Carl Charlier (Sweden, 1862–1934)
Auguste Charlois (France, 1864–1910)
Lyudmila Ivanovna Chernykh (Russia/Ukraine, 1935–2017)
Nikolai Stepanovich Chernykh (Russia/Ukraine, 1931–2004)
James Christy (USA, 1938–)
Klim Churyumov (Ukraine, 1937–2016)
Barry G. Clark (USA, 1938–)
Edwin Foster Coddington (USA, 1870–1950)
Jérôme Eugène Coggia (France, 1849–1919)
Josep Comas i Solà (Spain, 1868–1937)
Andrew Ainslie Common (UK, 1841–1903)
Guy Consolmagno (USA, 1952–)
Nicolaus Copernicus (Prussia/Poland), 1473–1543) 
Corsono Carsono (Spain)
Janine Connes (France, 1934–)
Pablo Cottenot (France)
Heather Couper (UK, 1949–2020)
Leopold Courvoisier (Switzerland, 1873–1955)
Arthur Edwin Covington (Canada, 1914–2001)
Philip Herbert Cowell (UK, 1870–1949)
Thomas George Cowling (UK, 1906–1990)
Andrew Claude de la Cherois Crommelin (UK, 1865–1939)
Luíz Cruls (Brazil, 1848–1908)
James Cuffey (USA, 1911–1999)
Heber Doust Curtis (USA, 1872–1942)
Florence Cushman (USA, 1860–1940)

D

Alexander Dalgarno (USA, 1928–2015)
Jacques Eugène d'Allonville (France, 1671–1732)
Andre Louis Danjon (France, 1890–1967)
Heinrich d'Arrest (Germany, 1822–1875)
George Howard Darwin (UK, 1845–1912)
Roger Davies (UK, 1954–)
Leonardo da Vinci (Italy, 1452–1519)
William Rutter Dawes (UK, 1799–1868)
Bernhard Dawson (Argentina, 1890–1960)
Leo de Ball (Germany, Austria, 1853–1916)
Henri Debehogne (Belgium, 1928–2007)
Annibale de Gasparis (Italy, 1819–1892)
Jean Baptiste Joseph Delambre (France, 1749–1822)
Charles-Eugène Delaunay (France, 1816–1872)
Eugène Joseph Delporte (Belgium, 1882–1955)
Audrey C. Delsanti (France, 1976–)
William Frederick Denning (UK, 1848–1931)
Alíz Derekas (Hungary, 1977–)
Willem de Sitter (Netherlands, 1872–1934)
Henri-Alexandre Deslandres (France, 1853–1948)
Alexander Nikolaevich Deutsch (Russia, 1900–1986)
Gérard de Vaucouleurs (France/USA, 1918–1995)
Robert Dicke (USA, 1916–1997)
Terence Dickinson (Canada, 1943–)
Thomas Digges (UK, 1546–1595)
Herbert Dingle (USA, 1890–1978)
Andrea Di Paola (Italy, 1970–)
Ewine van Dishoeck (Netherlands, 1955–)
Giovanni Battista Donati (Italy, 1826–1873)
Frank Drake (USA, 1930–)
Henry Draper (USA, 1837–1882)
Mary Anna Draper (USA, 1839–1914)
John Dreyer (Ireland, 1852–1926)
Alexander D. Dubyago (Russia), 1903–1959)
Dmitrij I. Dubyago (Russia), 1850–1918)
Jean C. B. Dufay (France, 1896–1967)
Raymond Smith Dugan (USA, 1878–1940)
James Dunlop (Scotland, 1793–1848)
Richard B. Dunn (USA, 1827–2005)
Petar Đurković (Serbia, 1908–1981)
Frank Watson Dyson (UK, 1868–1939)

E

Arthur Eddington (UK, 1882–1944)
Frank K. Edmondson (USA, 1912–2008)
Olin J. Eggen (USA, 1919–1998)
David J. Eicher (USA, 1961–)
Albert Einstein (Germany, 1879–1955)
Eise Eisinga (Netherlands, 1744–1828)
Eric Walter Elst (Belgium, 1936–2022)
Johann Franz Encke (Germany, 1791–1865)
Kin Endate (Japan, 1960–)
Eratosthenes (Alexandria, 276 BC–194 BC)
Emil Ernst (Germany, 1889–1942)
Ernest Esclangon (France, 1876–1954)
Fred Espenak (USA, 1953–)
Larry W. Esposito (USA, 1951–)
Eudoxus (Cnidus, ca. 408 BC–ca. 355 BC)
Robert Evans (Australia, 1937–)

F

David Fabricius (Netherlands, 1564–1617)
Sandra M. Faber (USA, 1945–)
Johannes Fabricius (Netherlands, 1587–1615)
Fearon Fallows (UK, 1789–1831)
Hervé Faye (France, 1814–1902)
Charles Fehrenbach (France, 1914–2008)
Farghani (Persia, 800–870)
James Ferguson (USA, 1797–1867)
Alex Filippenko (USA, 1958–)
Erwin Finlay-Freundlich (Germany, 1885–1964)
Axel Firsoff (UK, 1910–1981)
Debra Fischer (United States)
J. Richard Fisher (United States, 1943–)
Camille Flammarion (France, 1842–1925)
Gabrielle Renaudot Flammarion (France, 1867–1962)
John Flamsteed (UK, 1646–1719)
Honoré Flaugergues (France, 1755–1835)
Williamina Fleming (USA, 1857–1911)
Wilhelm Julius Foerster (Germany, 1832–1921)
Alfred Fowler (UK, 1868–1940)
William Alfred Fowler (USA, 1911–1995)
Philip Fox (USA, 1878–1944)
Andrew Fraknoi (USA, 1948–)
Joseph von Fraunhofer (Germany, 1787–1826)
Herbert Friedman (USA, 1916–2000 )
Dirk D. Frimout (Belgium, 1941–)
Edwin Brant Frost (USA, 1866–1935)
Shigehisa Fujikawa (Japan)
Naoshi Fukushima (Japan, 1925–2003)
Kiichirō Furukawa (Japan, 1929–2016)
Toshimasa Furuta (Japan)

G
Bryan Gaensler (Australia, 1973–)
Gan De (China, fl. 4th century BC)
Galileo Galilei (Italy, 1564–1642)
Julio Garavito Armero (Colombia, 1865–1920)
Gordon J. Garradd (Australia, 1959–)
Ben Gascoigne (New Zealand, Australia, 1915–2010)
Margaret Geller (United States, 1947)
Gautama Siddha (China, fl. 8th century AD)
Johann Gottfried Galle (Germany, 1812–1910)
George Gamow (Russia, USA, 1904–1968)
Carl Friedrich Gauss (Germany, 1777–1855)
Tom Gehrels (Netherlands, USA, 1925–2011)
Neil Gehrels (USA, 1952–2017)
Andrea M. Ghez (USA, 1965–)
Riccardo Giacconi (Italy, 1931–2018)
Michel Giacobini (France, 1873–1938)
Henry L. Giclas (USA, 1910–2007)
David Gill (UK, 1843–1914)
Fred Gillett (USA, 1937–2001)
Karl Glazebrook (UK, 1965–)
Ian Glass (Ireland/South Africa, 1939–)
Thomas Gold (USA, 1920–2004)
Leo Goldberg (USA, 1913–1987)
Peter Goldreich (USA, 1939–)
Hermann Goldschmidt (Germany, 1802–1866)
François Gonnessiat (France, 1856–1934)
John Goodricke (UK, 1764–1786)
Alyssa A. Goodman (USA, 1962–)
Abu Sa'id Gorgani (Persia, 9th century)
Paul Götz (Germany, 1883–1962)
Benjamin Apthorp Gould (USA, 1824–1896)
Andrew Graham (Ireland, 1815–1907)
Kathryn Aurora Gray (Canada, 2000–)
Charles Green (England, 1735–1771)
Jesse Greenstein (USA, 1909–2002)
John Grunsfeld (USA, 1956–)
Jay U. Gunter (United States, 1911–1994)
Alexander A. Gurshtein (Russia, 1937–2020)
Bengt Gustafsson (Sweden, 1943–)
Guo Shoujing (China, 1231–1316)
Alan Harvey Guth (USA, 1947–)

H
Yusuke Hagihara (Japan, 1897–1979)
Alan Hale (USA, 1958–) 
George Ellery Hale (USA, 1868–1938)
Asaph Hall (USA, 1829–1907)
Edmond Halley (England, 1656–1742)
Erika Hamden (USA, ?–)
Heidi Hammel (USA, 1960–)
Mario Hamuy (Chile, 1960–?)
Peter Andreas Hansen (Denmark, 1795–1874)
Abulfazl Harawi (Persia, 10th century)
Karl Ludwig Harding (Germany, 1765–1834)
Thomas Hariot (UK, 1560–1621)
Guillermo Haro (Mexico, 1913–1988)
Robert George Harrington (USA, 1904–1987)
Robert Sutton Harrington (USA, 1942–1993)
Edward Robert Harrison (UK/USA, 1917–2007)
William Kenneth Hartmann (USA, 1939–)
Lisa Harvey-Smith (Australia, 1979–)
Takeo Hatanaka (Japan, 1914–1963)
Tim Hawarden (South Africa, 1943–2009)
Stephen Hawking (UK, 1942–2018)
Will Hay (UK, 1888–1949)
Chushiro Hayashi (Japan, 1920–2010)
Otto Hermann Leopold Heckmann (Germany, 1901–1983)
Carl Heiles (USA, 1939–)
Joseph Helffrich (Germany, 1872–1971)
Eleanor Helin (USA, 1932–2009)
Maximilian Hell (Austria-Hungary, 1720–1792)
Karl Ludwig Hencke (Germany, 1793–1866)
Thomas Henderson (Scotland, 1798–1844)
Paul Henry (France, 1848–1905)
Prosper Henry (France, 1849–1903)
Abraham bar Hiyya (Spanish Jewish), (1070–1136)
George Howard Herbig (USA, 1920–2013)
Carl W. Hergenrother (USA, 1973–)
Caroline Herschel (UK, 1750–1848)
John Herschel (UK, 1792–1871)
William Herschel (UK/Germany, 1738–1822)
Ejnar Hertzsprung (Denmark, 1873–1967)
Johannes Hevelius (Poland, 1611–1687)
Antony Hewish (UK, 1924–2021)
George William Hill (USA, 1838–1914)
John Russell Hind (UK, 1823–1895)
Hipparchus (Nicaea, ca. 190 BC–120 BC)
Masanori Hirasawa (Japan)
Kiyotsugu Hirayama (Japan, 1874–1943)
Shin Hirayama (Japan, 1868–1945)
Gustave-Adolphe Hirn (France, 1815–1890)
Sebastian von Hoerner (Germany), 1919–2003)
Cuno Hoffmeister (Germany, 1892–1968)
Dorrit Hoffleit (USA, 1907–2007 )
Helen Sawyer Hogg (Canada, 1905–1993)
Minoru Honda (Japan, 1917–1990)
Kamil Hornoch (Czech Republic, 1972–)
Jeremiah Horrocks (UK, ca. 1619–1641)
Cornelis Johannes van Houten (Netherlands, 1920–2002)
Ingrid van Houten-Groeneveld (Netherlands, 1921–2015)
Martin van den Hove (Netherlands, 1605–1639)
Herbert Alonzo Howe (USA, 1858–1926)
Fred Hoyle (UK, 1915–2001)
Edwin Powell Hubble (USA, 1889–1953)
William Huggins (UK, 1824–1910)
Russell Alan Hulse (USA, 1950–)
Hendrik Christoffel van de Hulst (Netherlands, 1918–2000)
Milton Lasell Humason (USA, 1891–1972)
Thomas John Hussey (England, 1792–1854)
Christiaan Huygens (Netherlands, 1629–1695)
Yuji Hyakutake (Japan, 1950–2002)
Josef Allen Hynek (USA, 1910–1986)
Hypatia (Egypt, (born  350–370; died 415 AD)
Christopher Hansteen (Norway, 1784–1873)

I

Icko Iben, Jr. (USA, 1931–)
Kaoru Ikeya (Japan, 1943–)
Chris Impey (UK/USA, 1956–)
Robert Thorburn Ayton Innes (Scotland/South Africa, 1861–1933)
Shigeru Inoda (Japan, 1955–2008)
Jamal Nazrul Islam (Bangladesh, 1939–2013)
Edward Israel (USA, 1859–1884)
Iwahashi Zenbei (Japan, 1756–1811)
Masayuki Iwamoto (Japan, 1954–)
Shun-ei Izumikawa (Japan)

J

Cyril V. Jackson (South Africa, 1903–1988)
Karan Jani (India, 1988–)
Pierre Jules César Janssen (France, 1824–1907)
James Jeans (UK, 1877–1946)
Benjamin Jekhowsky (Russia/France/Algeria, 1881–1953)
Louise Freeland Jenkins (USA, 1888–1970)
David C. Jewitt (UK, 1958–)
Jiao Bingzhen (China, 1689–1726)
John A. Johnson (USA, 1977–)
Alfred Harrison Joy (USA, 1882–1973)
Vinod Johri (India, 1935–2014)

K
Ali Kuşçu (Turkey, 1403–1474)
Tetsuo Kagawa (Japan, 1969–)
Franz Kaiser (Germany, 1891–1962)
Kiyotaka Kanai (Japan, 1951–)
Hiroshi Kaneda (Japan, 1953–)
Henry Kandrup (USA, 1955–2003)
Jacobus Kapteyn (Netherlands, 1851–1922)
Lyudmila Karachkina (Ukraine, 1948–)
Ghiyath al-Kashi (Persia, 1380–1429)
Jeffrey Owen Katz (USA, 1960–)
Karlis Kaufmanis (Latvia/United States, 1910–2003
Kōyō Kawanishi (Japan, 1959–)
Nobuhiro Kawasato (Japan)
James Edward Keeler (USA, 1857–1900)
Paul Kempf (Germany, 1856–1920)
Johannes Kepler (Germany, 1571–1630)
Omar Khayyám (Persia, 1048–1131)
Al-Khujandi (Persia, 10th century)
Muhammad ibn Mūsā al-Khwārizmī, (Persia, 780–850)
Kidinnu (Babylon, 4th century BC; d. 330 BC?)
Hisashi Kimura (Japan, 1870–1943)
Maria Margarethe Kirch (Germany, 1670–1720)
Daniel Kirkwood (USA, 1814–1895)
Robert Kirshner (USA, 1949–)
Minoru Kizawa (Japan, 1947–)
Ernst Friedrich Wilhelm Klinkerfues (Germany, 1827–1884)
Viktor Knorre (Russia, 1840–1919)
Takao Kobayashi (Japan, 1961–)
Toru Kobayashi (Japan)
Luboš Kohoutek (1935–)
Masahiro Koishikawa (Japan, 1952–2020)
Nobuhisa Kojima (Japan, 1933–)
Takuo Kojima (Japan, 1955–)
Yoji Kondo (Japan, 1933–2017)
Zdeněk Kopal (Czech Republic, UK, USA, 1914–1993)
August Kopff (Germany, 1882–1960)
Korado Korlević (Croatia, 1958–)
Hiroki Kosai (Japan, 1933–)
Charles T. Kowal (USA, 1940–2011)
Robert Kraft (USA, 1927–2015)
Ľubor Kresák (Slovakia, 1927–1994)
Heinrich Kreutz (Germany, 1854–1927)
Kazuo Kubokawa (Japan, 1903–1943)
Marc Kuchner (USA, 1972–)
Gerard Kuiper (Netherlands, USA, 1905–1973)
Donald Kurtz (1948–)
Reiki Kushida (Japan)
Yoshio Kushida (Japan, 1957–)
György Kulin (Austria-Hungary, 1905–1989)

L

Lagadha (India, 1st millennium BCE)
Nicolas Louis de Lacaille (France, 1713–1762)
Claes-Ingvar Lagerkvist (Sweden, 1944–)
Joseph-Louis Lagrange (France, 1736–1813)
Jérôme Lalande (France, 1732–1807)
Johann Heinrich Lambert (France, Germany, 1728–1777)
David J. Lane (Canada, 1983–) 
Andrew E. Lange (United States, 1957–2010)
Samuel Pierpont Langley (USA, 1834–1906)
Pierre-Simon Laplace (France, 1749–1827)
Jacques Laskar (France, 1955–)
William Lassell (UK, 1799–1880)
Joseph Jean Pierre Laurent (France, fl. 1858)
Henrietta Swan Leavitt (USA, 1868–1921)
Typhoon Lee (USA and Taiwan, 1948–)
Guillaume Le Gentil (France, 1725–1792)
Georges Lemaître (Belgium, 1894–1966)
Pierre Lemonnier (France, 1715–1799)
Frederick C. Leonard (USA, 1896–1960)

Armin Leuschner (US, 1868–1953)
Geraint Lewis (Australia, 1969–)
Urbain Le Verrier (France, 1811–1877)
Li Fan (China, fl. 1st century AD)
James Lind (UK, 1736-1812)
Bertil Lindblad (Sweden, 1895–1965)
Adolph Friedrich Lindemann (Germany/UK, 1846–1927)
Chris Lintott (UK, 1980–)
Joseph Johann Littrow (Austria, 1781–1840)
Karl L. Littrow (Austria, 1811–1877)
Liu Xin (China, fl. 1st century AD)
Joseph Lockyer (UK, 1836–1920)
Avi Loeb (Israel, USA 1962–)
Maurice Loewy (Austria/France, 1833–1907)
Christian Sørensen Longomontanus (Denmark, 1562–1647)
Percival Lowell (USA, 1855–1916)
Ángel López (Spain, 1955–)
Álvaro López-García (Spain, 1941–2019)
John William Lubbock (UK, 1803–1865)
Knut Lundmark (Sweden, 1889–1958)
Robert Luther (Germany, 1822–1900)
Lupitus of Barcelona (Spain)
Jane Luu (South Vietnam, USA 1965–)
Willem Luyten (Dutch East Indies, Netherlands, 1899–1994)
Donald Lynden-Bell (UK, 1935–2018)
Andrew Lyne (UK, 1942–)
Bernard Lyot (France, 1897–1952)

M

Mahendra Suri (India, 14th century CE)
Ma Yize (China, 910–1005)
Adriaan van Maanen (USA, 1884–1946)
George Parker, 2nd Earl of Macclesfield (UK, c. 1697–1764)
Amy Mainzer (USA, 1974–)
Steve Mandel (USA)
Geoff Marcy (USA, 1954–)
Simon Marius (Germany, 1573–1624)
Brian G. Marsden (USA, 1937–2010)
Albert Marth (Germany, 1828–1897)
Nevil Maskelyne (UK, 1732–1811)
Charles Mason (UK, USA, 1730–1787)
John C. Mather (USA, 1946–)
Janet Akyüz Mattei (Turkey/USA, 1943–2004)
Edward Walter Maunder (UK, 1851–1928)
Pierre Louis Maupertuis (France, 1698–1759)
Alain Maury (France, 1958–)
Antonia Maury (USA, 1866–1952)
Matthew Fontaine Maury (USA, 1806–1873)
Brian May (UK, 1947–)
Cornell Mayer (United States, 1922–2005)
Tobias Mayer (Germany, 1723–1762)
Michel Mayor (Switzerland, 1942–)
Christopher McKee (USA, 1942–)
Robert S. McMillan (USA)
William H. McCrea (UK, 1904–1999)
Bruce A. McIntosh (Canada, 1929–2015)
Robert H. McNaught (Australia, 1956–)
Pierre Méchain (France, 1744–1804)
Thebe Medupe (South Africa, 1973–)
Karen Jean Meech (USA, 1956–)
Aden Baker Meinel (USA, 1922–2011)
Marjorie Pettit Meinel (USA, 1922–2008)
Fulvio Melia (USA, 1956–)
Philibert Jacques Melotte (UK, 1880–1961)
Paul Willard Merrill (USA, 1887–1961)
David Merritt (USA)
Charles Messier (France, 1730–1817)
Joel Hastings Metcalf (USA, 1866–1925)
Andreas Gerasimos Michalitsianos (USA, 1947–1997)
John Michell (UK, 1724–1793)
Elia Millosevich (Italy, 1848–1919)
Edward Arthur Milne (UK, 1896–1950)
Rudolph Minkowski (Germany, 1895–1976)
Marcel Gilles Jozef Minnaert (Belgium, Netherlands, 1893–1970)
Maria Mitchell (USA, 1818–1889)
Seidai Miyasaka (Japan, 1955–)
Yoshikane Mizuno (Japan, 1954–)
August Ferdinand Möbius (Germany, 1790–1868)
Anthony Moffat (Canada)
Johan Maurits Mohr (Netherlands, 1716–1775)
Samuel Molyneux (UK, 1689–1728)
Geminiano Montanari (Italy, 1633–1687)
Patrick Moore (UK, 1923–2012)
James Michael Moran (USA, 1943–)
William Wilson Morgan (USA, 1906–1994)
Hiroshi Mori (Japan, 1958–)
Amédée Mouchez (France, 1821–1892)
Antonín Mrkos (Czech Republic, 1918–1996)
Jean Mueller (USA, 1950–)
Masaru Mukai (Japan, 1949–)
Gustav Müller (Germany, 1851–1925)
Johannes Müller (Germany, 1436–1476)
Harutaro Murakami (Japan, 1872–1947)
Osamu Muramatsu (Japan, 1949–)
bin Musa, Ahmad (Persia, 805–873)
bin Musa, Hasan (Persia, 810–873)
bin Musa, Muhammad (Persia, (800–873)
Nils Mustelin (Finland, 1931–2004)

N

Nilakantha Somayaji (India, 1444–1544)
Valentin Naboth (Germany, Italy, 1523–1593)
Naburimannu (Babylonia, sometime between 6th century BC and 2nd century BC)
Takeshi Nagata (Japan, 1913–1991)
Ahmad Nahavandi (Persia, 7th–8th century)
Akimasa Nakamura (Japan, 1961–)
Syuichi Nakano (Japan, 1947–)
Jayant Narlikar (India, 1938–)
Naubakht (Persia, d. 776)
Al-fadl ibn Naubakht (Persia, 8th century)
Otto Neugebauer (Germany, USA, 1899–1990)
Grigoriy Nikolaevich Neujmin (Russia, 1886–1946)
Simon Newcomb (USA, 1835–1909)
Isaac Newton (UK, 1643–1727)
Seth Barnes Nicholson (USA, 1891–1963)
Albertus Antonie Nijland (Netherlands, 1868–1936)
Tsuneo Niijima (Japan, 1955–)
Peter Nilson (Sweden, 1937–1998)
Hōei Nojiri (Japan, 1885–1977)
Jaime Nomen (Spain, 1960–)
Toshiro Nomura (Japan, 1954–)

O

Knut Jørgen Røed Ødegaard (Norway, 1966–)
Okuro Oikawa (Japan, 1896–1970)
Tarmo Oja (Sweden, 1934–)
Tomimaru Okuni (Japan, 1931–)
Nicolaus Olahus (Hungarian, 1493–1568)
Heinrich Wilhelm Matthias Olbers (Germany, 1758–1840)
Gerard O'Neill (USA, 1927–1992)
Jan Hendrik Oort (Netherlands, 1900–1992)
Pieter Oosterhoff (Netherlands, 1904–1978)
Ernst Öpik (Estonia, Ireland, 1893–1985)
José Luis Ortiz Moreno (Spain, 1967–)
Yoshiaki Oshima (Japan, 1952–)
Donald Edward Osterbrock, USA, 1924–2007)
Liisi Oterma (Finland, 1915–2001)
Satoru Otomo (Japan, 1957–)
Jean Abraham Chrétien Oudemans (Netherlands, 1827–1906)

P

Rafael Pacheco (Spain, 1954–)
Bohdan Paczyński (Poland, 1940–2007)
Ľudmila Pajdušáková (Slovakia, 1916–1979)
Johann Palisa (Austria, 1848–1925)
Johann Palitzsch (Germany, 1723–1788)
Anton Pannekoek (Netherlands, 1873–1960)
Eugene Parker (USA, 1927–2022)
George Parker, 2nd Earl of Macclesfield (UK, c. 1697–1764)
William Parsons, Lord Rosse (Ireland, 1800–1867)
André Patry (France, 1902–1960)
Cecilia Payne-Gaposchkin (UK, USA, 1900–1979)
Ruby Payne-Scott (Australia, 1912–1981)
Jean-Claude Pecker (France, 1923–2020)
James Peebles (Canada, USA, 1935–)
Sir Cuthbert Peek, 2nd Baronet (UK, 1855–1901)
Manuel Peimbert (Mexico, 1941–)
Leslie Copus Peltier (USA, 1900–1980)
Roger Penrose (UK, 1931–)
Arno Penzias (USA, Germany, 1933–)
Luboš Perek (Czech Republic, 1919–2020)
Saul Perlmutter (USA, 1959–)
Charles Dillon Perrine (USA, Argentina, 1867–1951)
Henri Joseph Anastase Perrotin (France, 1845–1904)
Christian Heinrich Friedrich Peters (Germany, USA, 1813–1890)
George Henry Peters (USA, 1863–1947)
Mark M. Phillips (USA, 1951–)
Giuseppe Piazzi (Italy, 1746–1826)
Edward Charles Pickering (USA, 1846–1919)
William Henry Pickering (USA, 1858–1938)
Maynard Pittendreigh (USA, 1954–)
Phil Plait (USA, 1964–)
Giovanni Antonio Amedeo Plana (Italy, 1781–1864)
Petrus Plancius (Netherlands, 1552–1622)
John Stanley Plaskett (Canada, 1865–1941)
Norman Robert Pogson (UK, 1829–1891)
Christian Pollas (France, 1947–)
John Pond (England, 1767–1836)
Jean-Louis Pons (France, 1761–1831)
Carolyn Porco (USA, 1953–)
Vladimír Porubčan (Slovakia, 1940–)
Charles Pritchard (UK, 1808–1893)
Richard Proctor (England, 1837–1888)
Milorad B. Protić (Serbia, 1911– 2001)
Ptolemy of Alexandria (Roman Egypt, ca. 85–165)
Pierre Puiseux (France, 1855–1928)
Georg Purbach (Germany, 1423–1461)
Pythagoras of Samos (Greece, 580 BC–500 BC)
Paris Pişmiş (Armenia/Mexico, 1911–1999)

Q

Adolphe Quetelet (Belgium, 1796–1874)
Ali Qushji (Ottoman, 1403–1474)
M. Shahid Qureshi (Pakistan)

R

David Lincoln Rabinowitz (USA, 1960–)
Grote Reber (USA, 1911–2002)
Martin Rees (UK, 1942–)
Hubert Reeves (CA, 1932–)
Regiomontanus (Johannes Müller) (Germany, 1436–1476)
Julius Reichelt (Germany, 1637–1717)
Erasmus Reinhold (Prussia, Germany, 1511–1553)
Karl Reinmuth (Germany, 1892–1979)
Pieter Johannes van Rhijn (Netherlands, 1886–1960)
Giovanni Battista Riccioli (Italy, 1598–1671)
Mercedes Richards (Jamaica, 1955-2016)
Jean Richer (France, 1630–1696)
Edward Riddle (England, 1788–1854)
Adam Riess (USA, 1969–)
Fernand Rigaux (Belgium, 1905–1962)
George Willis Ritchey (USA, 1864–1945)
David Rittenhouse (USA, 1732–1796)
Hans-Walter Rix (Germany, 1964–)
Arjen Roelofs (Netherlands, 1754–1824)
Nancy G. Roman (USA, 1925–2018)
Elizabeth Roemer (USA, 1929–2016)
Gustavo E. Romero (Argentina, (1964–)
Roger of Hereford (England) c. 1176–1198
Ole Christensen Rømer (Denmark, 1644–1710)
Otto A. Rosenberger (Germany, 1800–1890)
Svein Rosseland (Norway, 1894–1985)
Bruno Rossi (Italy, 1905–1993)
Marta Graciela Rovira (Argentina)
Vera Rubin (USA, 1928–2016)
Henry Chamberlain Russell (Australia, 1836–1907)
Henry Norris Russell (USA, 1877–1957)
Martin Ryle (UK, 1918–1984)

S

Sir Edward Sabine (Ireland, 1788–1883)
Carl Sagan (USA, 1934–1996)
Megh Nad Saha (India, 1893–1956)
Edwin Ernest Salpeter (Austria, Australia, USA, 1924–2008)
Allan Rex Sandage (USA, 1926–2010)
Hendricus Gerardus van de Sande Bakhuyzen (Netherlands, 1838–1923)
Wallace Leslie William Sargent (UK, USA, 1935–2012)
Anneila Sargent (UK, USA, 1942–)
Naoto Sato (Japan, 1953–)
Alexandre Schaumasse (France, 1882–1958)
Giovanni Schiaparelli (Italy, 1835–1910)
Frank Schlesinger (USA, 1871–1943)
Bernhard Schmidt (Estonia, Sweden, Germany, 1879–1935)
Brian P. Schmidt (USA, 1967–)
Maarten Schmidt (Netherlands, 1929–)
Robert Schommer (USA, 1946–2001)
Johann Hieronymus Schröter (Germany, 1745–1816)
Lipót Schulhof (Hungary, 1847–1921)
Heinrich Christian Schumacher (Germany, 1780–1850)
Hans-Emil Schuster (Germany, 1934–)
Samuel Heinrich Schwabe (Germany, 1789–1875)
Karl Schwarzschild (Germany, 1873–1916)
Martin Schwarzschild (Germany, USA, 1912–1997)
Friedrich Karl Arnold Schwassmann (Germany, 1870–1964)
James Vernon Scotti (USA, 1960–)
Frederick Hanley Seares (USA, 1873–1964)
George Mary Searle (USA, 1839–1918)
Angelo Secchi (Italy, 1818–1878)
Sadao Sei (Japan)
Waltraut Seitter (Germany, 1930–2007)
Tsutomu Seki (Japan, 1930–)
Carl Keenan Seyfert (USA, 1911–1960)
Grigory Abramovich Shajn (Russia, 1892–1956)
Pelageya Fedorovna Shajn (Russia, 1894–1956)
Harlow Shapley (USA, 1885–1972)
Richard Sheepshanks (UK, 1794–1855)
Shen Kuo (China, 1031–1035)
Shi Shen (China, fl. 4th century BC)
Shibukawa Shunkai (Japan, 1639–1715)
Yoshisada Shimizu (Japan, 1943–)
Shinzo Shinjo (Japan, 1873–1938)
Qutb eddin Shirazi (Persia, 1236–1311)
Iosif Samuilovich Shklovsky (Russia, 1916–1985)
Vladimir Shkodrov (Bulgaria, 1930–2010)
Carolyn Jean Spellmann Shoemaker (USA, 1929–2021)
Eugene Merle Shoemaker (USA, 1928–1997)
Seth Shostak (USA, 1943–)
Andrew Siemion (USA, 1980–)
Willem de Sitter (Netherlands, 1872–1934)
Charlotte Moore Sitterly (USA, 1898–1990)
Brian A. Skiff (USA)
John Francis Skjellerup (Australia, South Africa, 1875–1952)
Vesto Melvin Slipher (USA, 1875–1969)
William Marshall Smart (UK, 1889–1975)
Tamara Mikhaylovna Smirnova (Russia, 1935–2001)
George Smoot  (USA, 1945–)
William Henry Smyth (UK, 1788–1865)
Willebrord Snel van Royen (Snellius) (Netherlands, 1580–1626)
Mary Fairfax Somerville (UK, 1780–1872)
Sir James South (UK, 1785–1867)
Sir Harold Spencer Jones (UK, 1890–1960)
Lyman Spitzer (USA, 1914–1997)
Friederich Wilhelm Gustav Spörer (Germany, 1822–1895)
Rainer Spurzem (Germany, 1956–)
Anton Staus (Germany, 1872–1955)
Joel Stebbins (USA, 1878–1966)
Johan Stein (Netherlands, 1871–1951)
Karl August von Steinheil, (Germany, 1801–1870)
Édouard Stephan (France, 1837–1923)
Denise Stephens (USA)
Charles Bruce Stephenson (USA, 1929–2001))
David J. Stevenson (New Zealand, 1948–)
Edward James Stone (1831–1897)
F. J. M. Stratton (UK, 1881–1960)
Bengt Georg Daniel Strömgren (Denmark, 1908–1987)
Friedrich Georg Wilhelm (von) Struve (Germany, Russia, 1793–1864)
Karl Hermann Struve (Russia, Germany, 1854–1920)
Gustav Wilhelm Ludwig Struve (Russia, 1858–1920)
Otto Struve (Russia, USA, 1897–1963)
Otto Wilhelm (von) Struve (Russia, 1819–1905)
Su Song (China, 1020–1101)
Abd Al-Rahman Al Sufi (Persia, 903–986)
Matsuo Sugano (Japan, 1939–)
Atsushi Sugie (Japan)
Nicholas Suntzeff (USA, 1952–)
Rashid Alievich Sunyaev (Uzbekistan Russia Germany, 1943–)
Shohei Suzuki (Japan)
Lewis A. Swift (USA, 1820–1913)
Frédéric Sy (France)

T

Akihiko Tago (Japan, 1932–)
Atsushi Takahashi (Japan, 1965–)
Kesao Takamizawa (Japan, 1952–)
Jill Tarter (USA, 1944–)
Joseph Hooton Taylor Jr. (USA, 1941–)
John Tebbutt (Australia, 1834–1916)
Ernst Wilhelm Leberecht Tempel (Germany, 1821–1889)
Thabit ibn Qurra (Iraq, 826–901)
Thorvald Nicolai Thiele (Denmark, 1838–1910)
Louis Thollon (France, 1829–1887)
Norman G. Thomas (USA, 1930–2020)
John Thome (USA, Argentina, 1843–1908)
Kip Stephen Thorne (USA, 1940–)
Friedrich Tietjen (Germany, 1834–1895)
Beatrice Muriel Hill Tinsley (New Zealand, USA, 1941–1981)
François Félix Tisserand (France, 1845–1896)
Johann Daniel Titius (Germany, 1729–1796)
Yasuo Tanaka (Japan, 1931–2018)
Clyde W. Tombaugh (USA, 1906–1997)
Kōichirō Tomita (Japan, 1925–2006)
Richard Tousey (USA, 1908–1997)
Charles Townes (USA, 1915–2015)
Virginia Trimble (USA, 1943–)
Chad Trujillo (USA, 1973–)
Robert Julius Trumpler (USA, 1886–1956)
R. Brent Tully (USA, 1943–)
Herbert Hall Turner (England, 1861–1930)
Nasir al-Din Tusi (Persia, 1201–1274)
Horace Parnell Tuttle (USA, 1839–1923)
Neil deGrasse Tyson (USA, 1958–)

U

Seiji Ueda (Japan, 1952–)
Ulugh Beg (Uzbekistan, 1394–1449)
Antonio de Ulloa (Spain), 1716–1795)
Anne Barbara Underhill (Canada, 1920–2003)
Albrecht Unsöld (Germany, 1905–1995)
Takeshi Urata (Japan, 1947–2012)
Mu’ayyad al-Din al-’Urdi (Persia d. 1266)
Fumiaki Uto (Japan)

V

Yrjö Väisälä (Finland, 1891–1971)
Benjamin Valz (France, 1787–1867)
James Van Allen (USA, 1914–2006)
George Van Biesbroeck (Belgium, USA, 1880–1974)
Hendrik Christoffel van de Hulst (Netherlands, 1918–2000)
Peter van de Kamp (USA, 1901–1995)
Sidney van den Bergh (Canada, 1929–)
Martin van den Hove (Netherlands, 1605–1639)
Hendricus Gerardus van de Sande Bakhuyzen (Netherlands, 1838–1923)
Hendrik van Gent (Netherlands, South Africa, 1900–1947)
Cornelis Johannes van Houten (Netherlands, 1920–2002)
Pieter Johannes van Rhijn (Netherlands, 1886–1960)
Gérard de Vaucouleurs (France, USA, 1918–1995)
Zdeňka Vávrová (Czech Republic or Slovakia, 1945–)
Jean-Pierre Verdet (France, 1932–)
Philippe Véron (France, 1939–2014)
Frank Washington Very (United States, 1852–1927)
Yvon Villarceau (France, 1813–1883)
Julie Vinter Hansen (Denmark), 1890–1960)
Hermann Carl Vogel (Germany, 1841–1907)
Friedrich Georg Wilhelm von Struve (Germany, Russia, 1793–1864)
Otto Wilhelm von Struve (Russia, 1819–1905)
Alexander N. Vyssotsky (Russia/USA, 1888–1973)
Emma Vyssotsky (USA, 1894–1975)

W

Arno Arthur Wachmann (Germany, 1902–1990)
Abul Wáfa (Persia, 940–997/998)
Walcher of Malvern (England d. 1135)
George Wallerstein (1930–2021)
William Wales (UK, ca. 1734–1798)
Dennis Walsh (UK, 1933–2005)
Qingde Wang (USA/China)
Brian Warner (astronomer) (UK, 1939–)
Brian D. Warner (USA, 1952–)
Kazuro Watanabe (Japan, 1955–)
James Craig Watson (USA, 1838–1880)
Edmund Weaver (UK, 1663–1748)
Kim Weaver (USA, 1969–)
Thomas William Webb (UK, 1807–1885)
Rachel Webster (Australia, 1951–)
Alfred Lothar Wegener (Germany, 1880–1930)
Gary A. Wegner (USA, 1944–)
Wei Pu (China, 960–1279)
Karl von Weizsäcker (Germany, 1912–2007)
Godefroy Wendelin (Belgium, 1580–1667)
Richard M. West (Denmark, 1941–)
Gart Westerhout (Netherlands, USA, 1927–2012)
Bengt Westerlund (Sweden, 1921–2008)
J. G. Westphal (Germany, 1824–1859)
Johann Heinrich Westphal (Germany, Italy, 1794–1831)
George Wetherill (1925–2006)
John Archibald Wheeler (USA, 1911–2008)
Fred Lawrence Whipple (USA, 1906–2004)
Albert Whitford (USA, 1905–2002)
Mary Watson Whitney (USA, 1847–1921)
Chandra Wickramasinghe (UK, 1939–)
Paul Wild (Switzerland, 1925–2014)
Olin C. Wilson (USA, 1909–1994)
Ida E. Woods (USA, 1870–1940)
Robert Wilson (USA, 1936–)
Rogier Windhorst (USA, 1955–)
Vincent Wing (UK, 1619–1668)
Anna Winlock (USA, 1857–1904)
Henry "Trae" Winter (USA, 1972)
John Winthrop (Massachusetts Bay Colony, 1714–1779)
Friedrich August Theodor Winnecke (Germany, 1835–1897)
Carl Wirtanen (USA, 1910–1990)
Jack Wisdom (USA, 1953–)
Gustav Witt (Germany, 1866–1946)
Maximilian Wolf (Germany, 1863–1932)
Aleksander Wolszczan (Poland, 1946–)
Edith Jones Woodward (USA), (1914–2002)
Richard van der Riet Woolley (UK, 1906–1986)
Frances Woodworth Wright (USA, 1897–1989) 
Thomas Wright (UK, 1711–1786)
Gillian Wright (UK)

Y

Issei Yamamoto (Japan, 1889–1959)
Masayuki Yanai (Japan, 1959–)
Yi Xing (China, 683–727)
Anne Sewell Young (USA, 1871–1961)
Charles Augustus Young (USA, 1834–1908)
James Whitney Young (USA, 1941–)
Judith Young (USA, 1952–2014)

Z

Franz Xaver von Zach (Germany, 1753–1832)
Abraham Zacuto (Spain/Portugal,  1450–1510)
John Zarnecki (UK, 1949–)
Yakov Borisovich Zel'dovich (USSR, 1914–1987)
Zhang Daqing (China, 1969–)
Zhang Heng (China, 78–139)
Zhang Yuzhe (China, 1902–1986)
Lyudmila Vasil'evna Zhuravleva (Russia/Ukraine, 1946–)
Felix Ziegel (Soviet Union, 1920–1988)
Zu Chongzhi (China, 429–500)
Fritz Zwicky (Switzerland, USA, 1898–1974)

Others who influenced astronomy and astrophysics
The following is a list of people who are not astronomers but made a contribution to the field of astronomy and astrophysics.

Hans Bethe (1906–2005), (physicist)
Niels Bohr (1885–1962), (physicist)
Andreas Cellarius (Netherlands, Germany, 1596–1665), (cartographer)
Freeman Dyson (1923–2020), (physicist)
Albert Einstein (1879–1955), (physicist)
Karl Guthe Jansky (USA, 1905–1950), (radio astronomer)
James Clerk Maxwell (UK, 1831–1879), (physicist)
Thomas Young (United Kingdom, 1773–1829), (physicist)
Abdus Salam (1926–1996), (physicist)
Riazuddin (1936–2013), (physicist)

References

Astronomical Society of the Pacific: Women in Astronomy
The Oldest Living Astronomers in India honored by World Records India

See also
List of astronomical instrument makers
List of women astronomers
List of Russian astronomers and astrophysicists

Astronomers
History of astronomy

Astronomy-related lists